Sitz Mountain is a summit located in Central New York Region of New York located in the Town of Webb in Herkimer County, north-northeast of Stillwater.

References

Mountains of Herkimer County, New York
Mountains of New York (state)